Lithosciadium is a genus of flowering plants belonging to the family Apiaceae.

Its native range is Siberia to Mongolia.

Species:

Lithosciadium kamelinii 
Lithosciadium multicaule

References

Apioideae